Martino Scarafile (July 1, 1927 – December 27, 2011) was the Catholic bishop of the Diocese of Castellaneta, Italy.

Ordained to the priesthood in 1950, Scarafile was named bishop in 1980. He retired in 2003.

Notes

Bishops in Apulia
1927 births
2011 deaths